This is a list of notable individuals born in Denmark of Lebanese ancestry or people of Lebanese and Danish dual nationality who live or lived in Denmark.

Politics
Asmaa Abdol-Hamid, social worker and politician 
Ahmed Akkari, political activist

Athletes
Wassim El Banna, footballer (soccer) 
Bassel Jradi, footballer (soccer)
Ahmed Khaddour, boxer

See also
List of Lebanese people
List of Lebanese people (Diaspora)

References

Denmark
Lebanese

Lebanese